At least three ships of the Hellenic Navy have borne the name Aigaion ("Aegean"):

 , a  launched in 1941 as HMS Lauderdale and transferred to Greece and renamed in 1946. She was returned to the Royal Navy in 1959 and scrapped in 1960.
 , a  launched in 1960 as Weser for the German navy she was transferred to Greece in 1976 and renamed. She was stricken in 1991.
 , an  launched in 1978 as HNLMS Banckert she was transferred to Greece in 1993 and renamed.

Hellenic Navy ship names